The 2013–14 Maryland Eastern Shore Hawks men's basketball team represented the University of Maryland Eastern Shore during the 2013–14 NCAA Division I men's basketball season. The Hawks, led by sixth year head coach Frankie Allen, played their home games at the Hytche Athletic Center and were members of the Mid-Eastern Athletic Conference. They finished the season 6–24, 4–12 in MEAC play to finish in first place. They lost in the first round of the MEAC tournament to Norfolk State.

At the end of the season, head coach Frankie Allen was fired after a six-year record of 42–139.

Roster

Schedule
Source:

|-
!colspan=9 style="background:#800000; color:#808080;"| Regular season

|-
!colspan=9 style="background:#800000; color:#808080;"| 2014 MEAC tournament

References

Maryland Eastern Shore Hawks men's basketball seasons
Maryland Eastern Shore